These are the partial results of the athletics competition at the 1993 Mediterranean Games taking place between 17 and 20 June 1993 in Narbonne, France.

Men's results

100 meters
Heats – 17 JuneWind: Heat 1: +1.5 m/s, Heat 2: +0.6 m/s

Final – 17 JuneWind: +1.4 m/s

200 meters
Heats – 18 JuneWind: Heat 2: -2.3 m/s

Final – 18 JuneWind: -1.8 m/s

400 meters
Heats – 17 June

Final – 18 June

800 meters
Heats – 17 June

Final – 18 June

1500 meters
20 June

5000 meters
20 June

10,000 meters

Marathon
20 June

110 meters hurdles

400 meters hurdles
Heats – 18 June

Final – 19 June

3000 meters steeplechase
19 June

4 × 100 meters relay
20 June

4 × 400 meters relay
20 June

High jump
18 June

Pole vault
20 June

Long jump
18 June

Triple jump
19 June

Shot put
17 June

Discus throw

Javelin throw
19 June

Women's results

100 meters
17 JuneWind: +0.8 m/s

200 meters
18 JuneWind: -1.3 m/s

400 meters
18 June

800 meters
18 June

1500 meters

3000 meters
17 June

Marathon
20 June

100 meters hurdles
Heats – 18 JuneWind: Heat 1: -1.5 m/s, Heat 2: -1.8 m/s

Final – 19 JuneWind: -0.8 m/s

400 meters hurdles
19 June

4 × 100 meters relay
20 June

High jump
17 June

Long jump

Shot put

Discus throw

Javelin throw

Heptathlon
18–19 June

References

Mediterranean Games
1993